Fred Rompelberg (born 30 October 1945, in Maastricht) is a Dutch cyclist who is mainly known for taking several attempts to break the Absolute World Speed Record Cycling. On 3 October 1995 he cycled behind a motor dragster from the team Strasburg Racing's Brothers on the Bonneville Salt Flats in Utah, with a speed of 268.831 kilometers per hour (167.044 mph). He beat the previous record of 245 km/h held by John Howard which was obtained in 1985 at the same location in Utah. 
The relevant world record was broken anew in 2018 by Denise Mueller-Korenek who reached a speed of 296.009 km/h.

During the seventies, eighties and nineties, Rompelberg was mostly active as a stayer. Among his victories was the Dutch Championship in 1977.

Nowadays Rompelberg is into cycling holidays on Majorca, Spain. He is married and has two daughters.

Rompelberg became a professional cyclist in 1971 and still had a professional license in 2010, making him the oldest active professional cyclist in the world at that time.

Successes 
 11 world records,
 12 European records,
 7 wins in bicycle road races,
 Dutch champion on a bicycle behind heavy motorcycles, many victories behind heavy motorbikes on bicycle routes,
 Current holder of the hour against the clock world record behind heavy engines with 86.449 km / h
 Current holder of the 100 km world record behind heavy engines with 1h 10 '363/100'
 The Absolute Speed World Record Cycling behind a dragster on a dried up American salt flat with 268.831 km / h.

See also
Fastest speed on a bicycle

References

Dutch male cyclists
1945 births
Living people
Sportspeople from Maastricht
Cyclists from Limburg (Netherlands)